Pool B (Kuala Lumpur) of the 2019 Fed Cup Asia/Oceania Zone Group II was one of four pools in the Asia/Oceania zone of the 2019 Fed Cup. Four teams competed in a round robin competition, with the top team and the bottom team proceeding to their respective sections of the play-offs: the top team played for advancement to Group I.

Standings 

Standings are determined by: 1. number of wins; 2. number of matches; 3. in two-team ties, head-to-head records; 4. in three-team ties, (a) percentage of sets won (head-to-head records if two teams remain tied), then (b) percentage of games won (head-to-head records if two teams remain tied), then (c) Fed Cup rankings.

Round-robin

Hong Kong vs. Pakistan

New Zealand vs. Bangladesh

Hong Kong vs. Bangladesh

New Zealand vs. Pakistan

Hong Kong vs. New Zealand

Pakistan vs. Bangladesh

References

External links 
 Fed Cup website

2019 Fed Cup Asia/Oceania Zone